The Codex Curinthianus, designated by  β or 26 (in Beuron system), is a 6th or 7th century Latin manuscript of the New Testament. The text, written on vellum, is a version of the old Latin. The manuscript contains the fragments of the Gospel of Luke, on only 2 parchment leaves. 

It contains a fragments of the Gospel of Luke 1:64-2:50 on two folios. It was published by Donatien de Bruyne.

The Latin text of the codex is a representative of the Western text-type in itala recension.

Currently it is housed at the St. Paul's Abbey in the Lavanttal (Stiftsbibliothek, 25.3.19) in Carinthia.

See also 

 List of New Testament Latin manuscripts
 Codex Frisingensis

References

Further reading 

 D. de Bruyne, RBén, XXXV (1923), pp. 62-80.
 A. Jülicher, Itala. Das Neue Testament in Altlateinischer Überlieferung, Walter de Gruyter, Berlin, New York, 1976.

Vetus Latina New Testament manuscripts
7th-century biblical manuscripts